Pavel Patera (born September 6, 1971) is a Czech former professional ice hockey player. Patera was drafted by the Dallas Stars at 1998 NHL Entry Draft as the 153rd pick overall.

Career
Patera has played in several countries. He started his career in his native country playing for HC Kladno in 1990. He stayed with Kladno until 1996 when he and his two linemates in Kladno and in the Czech national team, Martin Procházka and Otakar Vejvoda moved to Sweden to join the Elitserien team AIK for the 1996–1997 season. Procházka left AIK for Toronto Maple Leafs during the summer of 1997 and Vejvoda was forced to retire due to an injury early in the 1997/98 season. Patera left AIK in 1998 too, moved back home to the Czech Republic and signed with HC Vsetín.

After only one season with HC Vsetín Patera signed with the Dallas Stars. However, he played only 12 games with the Stars before he moved back to the Czech Republic and HC Vsetín. The following 2000/01 season he signed with NHL team Minnesota Wild, but after only playing 20 games with the Wild and spending the rest of the season in the IHL, Patera decided to return to Europe. He played with HC Kladno for a very short time (three games in the beginning of the 2001/02 season), before signing with Russian team Avangard Omsk, where he spend that season and the two following.

In the summer of 2004 he signed again with HC Kladno, but this time he stayed with the club. And with the exception of a three-month loan to Swedish Elitserien club Färjestads BK in the spring of 2006, he has stayed with Kladno (as of March 25, 2007).

Achievements
 World Championship Gold Medal 1996, 1999, 2000, 2001
 World Championship Bronze Medal 1997, 1998
 Olympic Gold Medal 1998
 Czech Extraliga Champion 98/99
 Russian Super League Champion 03/04
 Elitserien Champion 05/06

Career statistics

Regular season and playoffs

International

References

External links

1971 births
Living people
AIK IF players
Avangard Omsk players
Czech ice hockey centres
Dallas Stars draft picks
Dallas Stars players
Czech expatriate ice hockey players in Russia
Färjestad BK players
Rytíři Kladno players
VHK Vsetín players
Ice hockey players at the 1998 Winter Olympics
Ice hockey players at the 2002 Winter Olympics
Minnesota Wild players
Olympic gold medalists for the Czech Republic
Olympic ice hockey players of the Czech Republic
Olympic medalists in ice hockey
Sportspeople from Kladno
Medalists at the 1998 Winter Olympics
Czechoslovak ice hockey centres
Czech expatriate ice hockey players in the United States
Czech expatriate ice hockey players in Sweden